Sar Khun (also Romanized as Sar Khūn) is a city in Miankuh District of Ardal County, Chaharmahal and Bakhtiari province, Iran. At the 2006 census, its population was 1,887 in 387 households, when it was a village in Miankuh Rural District. The following census in 2011 counted 1,737 people in 392 households. The latest census in 2016 showed a population of 2,131 people in 392 households, by which time the village had been elevated to the staus of a city. The city is populated by Lurs.

References 

Ardal County

Cities in Chaharmahal and Bakhtiari Province

Populated places in Chaharmahal and Bakhtiari Province

Populated places in Ardal County

Luri settlements in Chaharmahal and Bakhtiari Province